The men's 105 kg weightlifting event was the second-heaviest men's event at the 2014 Commonwealth Games, limiting competitors to a maximum of 105 kilograms of body mass. The competition took place on 30 July at 7:30 pm. The event took place at the Clyde Auditorium. By winning the gold medal, David Katoatau became the first medalist from Kiribati at the Commonwealth Games.

Result

References

Weightlifting at the 2014 Commonwealth Games